Per Naroskin, (born 25 September 1959) is a Swedish psychologist, psychotherapist, author and stand-up comedian. Naroskin participated in different shows at Sveriges Radio, such as Studio Ett, Spanarna, and Jonas Val, and in 2006 he presented an episode of the SR show Sommar i P1 where he spoke about his life. He has also participated in the SVT show Fråga Doktorn.

Bibliography
På spaning efter den vuxna människan (1995)
Nyttan av att tala högt med sig själv (2002)
Fuskaren som försvann (2012)

References

External links 

Living people
1959 births
Swedish male comedians
Swedish psychologists
20th-century Swedish writers
20th-century Swedish male writers
21st-century Swedish male writers
20th-century Swedish comedians
21st-century Swedish comedians